Highway 28 is a highway in the Canadian province of Saskatchewan. It runs from Highway 18 near Lake Alma to Highway 13. Highway 28 passes through Radville.

Highway 28 was originally designated as part of Highway 18, which continued east to Estevan and ended at Highway 13. The section north of Lake Alma became Highway 28 when Highway 18 was extended west to Minton in the 1960s.

Major intersections
From south to north:

References

028